Xingu is a 2011 Brazilian drama film directed by Cao Hamburger and scripted by him, Elena Soárez and Anna Muylaert. Starring João Miguel, Felipe Camargo and Caio Blat, the film tells the Villas-Bôas brothers trajectory from the moment in which they joined the Roncador-Xingu expedition, part of the Westward March of Getúlio Vargas, in 1943.

It was shot in Tocantins, Xingu National Park, and in the Greater São Paulo. The film was exhibited for the first time in 2011, at the 8th Amazonas Film Festival. The official premiere took place on April 6, 2012. The film was watched by about 370,000 spectators and has raised more than four million reals in box office. A television adaptation in four episodes was aired on Rede Globo between 25 and December 28, 2012.

Plot
The story takes place in the 1940s when the Villas-Bôas brothers—Claudio (João Miguel), Leonardo (Caio Blat) and Orlando (Felipe Camargo)—start an exploratory expedition into the Xingu River. They make contact with the local tribes, learn to live in the rainforest, and persuade a reluctant government to found the Xingu National Park.

Cast
João Miguel as Claudio Villas Boas
Felipe Camargo as Orlando Villas Boas
Caio Blat as Leonardo Villas Boas
Maiarim Kaiabi as Prepori
Awakari Tumã Kaiabi as Pionim
Adana Kambeba as Kaiulu
Tapaié Waurá as Izaquiri
Totomai Yawalapiti as Guerreiro Kalapalo
Maria Flor as Marina
Augusto Madeira as Noel Nutels
Fábio Lago as Bamburra

Awards
Jury Award for Best Cinematography - 2012 Prêmio Contigo Cinema
3rd place Panorama Audience Award for Fiction Film - 2012 Berlin International Film Festival

References

External links

Official blog

2011 films
2010s historical drama films
Brazilian historical drama films
Docudrama films
Films directed by Cao Hamburger
Films set in the 1940s
Films set in Brazil
Films shot in Mato Grosso
Films shot in São Paulo (state)
2010s Portuguese-language films
Tupi-language films
2011 drama films
Xingu Indigenous Park
Brazilian multilingual films